The Macedonian Anti-Fascist Organization was a Macedonian political organization formed in 1941 in the Voden region at the initiative of the Communist Party of Greece. The organization was headed by Vangel Ajanovski-Oče, Angel Gacev, Risto Kordalov, Dini Papayankov and others. The aim of the organization was, in alliance with the Greek EAM-ELAS, to fight the fascist forces. It was dissolved in 1943.

References

Organizations established in 1941
Organizations disestablished in 1943
Greek Resistance
Greek Macedonia in World War II
Communist Party of Greece
Left-wing militant groups in Greece